Eric J. Hill, Ph.D., FAIA, is a Professor of Practice in Architecture at the University of Michigan. He earned his bachelor's degree in Architecture in 1970 from the University of Pennsylvania, a Masters in Architecture from Harvard in 1972, and a Ph.D in Architecture from the University of Pennsylvania in 1976. He was a Marshall Research Fellow at Denmark's Royal Academy of Fine Arts from 1972 to 1973. He is the co-author, along with John Gallagher, of AIA Detroit: The American Institute of Architects Guide to Detroit Architecture. He has served as a Director of Urban Planning and Design at the Detroit firm of Albert Kahn Associates. He has participated in projects such as the promenade on the Detroit International Riverfront, the Detroit Opera House restoration, and the Cadillac Place redevelopment. He has received numerous awards from the American Institute of Architects.

Further reading

External links
University of Michigan - Eric J. Hill

American architects
Fellows of the American Institute of Architects
University of Michigan faculty
University of Pennsylvania School of Design alumni
Harvard Graduate School of Design alumni
Living people
Year of birth missing (living people)